Nashville is an unincorporated community in the town of Nashville, Forest County, Wisconsin, United States.

History
A post office called Nashville was established in 1902, and remained in operation until it was discontinued in 1944. The community was named for G. V. Nash.

References

Unincorporated communities in Forest County, Wisconsin
Unincorporated communities in Wisconsin